Jim Reeves Sings is the debut studio album by Jim Reeves, released in 1955 by Abbott Record Co.

It was the singer's only album released by the Abbott record label.

Back in the days, Reeves sang in a loud "hillbilly" style typical of country and western singers of the era. When Reeves signed with RCA, his new label secured the rights to his "hillbilly-sounding" Abbott masters and, to the singer's displeasure, used them for his 1956  album Bimbo. The songs included on both Jim Reeves Sings and Bimbo are "Drinking Tequila", "Where Does a Broken Heart Go", "Mexican Joe", "Mother Went A-Walkin'", and "Penny Candy".

In 1982, RCA International released a Europe-only 2-LP compilation of the recordings Reeves' made for the Abbott label. The first volume, titled The Abbott Recordings Volume 1, was practically a repackage of Jim Reeves Sings with several additional tracks. It also had roughly the same cover and stated that its sleeve notes were "a facsimile of those carried on Jim's first and only album release on Abbott Records in 1954."

History 
By the time of the album's release, Jim Reeves had already signed with RCA Victor.

That was the first ever album issued by Abbott Record Co. It repackaged some of Reeves' hit recordings for the label, namely the "smash" "Mexican Joe" and smaller hits like "Drinking Tequila", "Penny Candy", and "The Wilder Your Heart Beats". Billboard magazine concluded in its review: "Should have a good sale now that the c.&w. market is gradually turning to 12-inch LP's."

Track listing 
 Side 1

 Side 2

The Abbott Recordings Volume 1  
 Side 1

 Side 2

 Also, in the 1982 repackage the sixth track on the first side is titled "Shall We Gather at the River (Mother Went A Walkin')", the second track of the second side – "Gypsy Heart", and the fifth track on the second side – "The Wilder Your Heart Beats the Sweeter You Love".

References 

1955 debut albums
Jim Reeves albums
Abbott Records albums